Team Bonitas was a South African road cycling team that competed from 2008 to 2016. It had a UCI Continental status in 2011 and 2012. The team was owned by former professional cyclist Malcolm Lange.

Major wins
2010
 Emirates Cup, Malcolm Lange
2011
  South African National Road Race Championship, Darren Lill
 Stage 6 Tour of South Africa, Darren Lill
 Stage 1 Tour du Maroc, Johann Rabie
2012
 Overall Tour du Rwanda, Darren Lill
Stages 3 & 7, Darren Lill
 Amashova Durban Classic, Johann Rabie

References

External links

Cycling teams established in 2008
Cycling teams disestablished in 2016
UCI Continental Teams (Africa)
Cycling teams based in South Africa
Defunct cycling teams